The 2017 Aegon Ilkley Trophy was a professional tennis tournament played on outdoor grass courts. It was the third edition of the tournament for both men and women. It was part of the 2017 ATP Challenger Tour and the 2017 ITF Women's Circuit. It took place in Ilkley, United Kingdom, on 19–25 June 2017.

Men's singles main draw entrants

Seeds 

 1 Rankings as of 12 June 2017.

Other entrants 
The following players received wildcards into the singles main draw:
  Jay Clarke
  Lloyd Glasspool
  Brydan Klein
  Marcus Willis

The following player received entry into the singles main draw using a protected ranking:
  Yuki Bhambri

The following players received entry into the singles main draw as special exempts:
  Sam Groth
  Gianluigi Quinzi

The following players received entry from the qualifying draw:
  Alex Bolt
  Alex De Minaur
  Matthew Ebden
  Dennis Novikov

Women's singles main draw entrants

Seeds 

 1 Rankings as of 12 June 2017.

Other entrants 
The following player received a wildcard into the singles main draw:
  Freya Christie
  Harriet Dart
  Laura Robson
  Gabriella Taylor

The following player received entry into the singles main draw using a protected ranking:
  Magdaléna Rybáriková

The following player received entry into the singles main draw as a special exempt:
  Zarina Diyas

The following players received entry from the qualifying draw:
  Caroline Dolehide
  Natela Dzalamidze
  Marina Erakovic
  Maria Sanchez

The following player received entry as a lucky loser:
  Jasmine Paolini

Champions

Men's singles

 Márton Fucsovics def.  Alex Bolt 6–1, 6–4.

Women's singles
 
 Magdaléna Rybáriková def.  Alison Van Uytvanck, 7–5, 7–6(7–3)

Men's doubles
 
 Leander Paes /  Adil Shamasdin def.  Brydan Klein /  Joe Salisbury 6–2, 2–6, [10–8].

Women's doubles
 
 Anna Blinkova /  Alla Kudryavtseva def.  Paula Kania /  Maryna Zanevska, 6–1, 6–4

External links 
 2017 Aegon Ilkley Trophy at ITFtennis.com
 Official website

2017 ITF Women's Circuit
Aegon Ilkley Trophy
2017
2017 in English tennis
June 2017 sports events in the United Kingdom